Lonely Avenue is a collaboration album by American singer-songwriter Ben Folds and English novelist Nick Hornby, and was released in the United States of America on September 28, 2010 by Nonesuch Records.

The album contains 11 new songs featuring music by Folds with lyrics by Hornby. "From Above", the first single, was released on August 6 and is available on the iTunes Store.

Track listing

Personnel
Ben Folds – vocals, piano, bass, drums, Roland Juno, Moog, Hammond, clav, acoustic guitars, wind chimes, ARP string ensemble, percussion, handclaps
Joe Costa – handclaps
Kate Miller-Heidke – vocals
Keir Nuttall – primal screams
Jared Reynolds – bass, backing vocals
Jack Jezioro, Joel Reist - bass
Sam Smith – drums, backing vocals
Chad Chapin – acoustic guitar, primal percussion, percussion, glockenspiel, backing vocals
Andrew Higley – Wurlitzer, Fender Rhodes, Roland Jupiter, Roland Juno, Moog, French horn, backing vocals
Paul Buckmaster – string arrangement, conductor
David Davidson, David Angell, Carolyn Bailey, Christian Teal, Conni Ellisor, Connie Heard, Elisabeth Small, Karen Winkelmann, Kristina Siemer, Mary Kathryn Vanosdale, Stefan Petrescu, Wei Tsun Chang – violin
Kristin Wilkinson – viola, contractor
Chris Farrell, Kathryn Plummer, Monisa Angell - viola
John Catchings, Anthony LaMarchina, Kirsten Greer, Sarighani Reist – cello
Beth Beeson, Jennifer Kummer - French horn
Jeff Bailey, Steve Patrick - trumpet
Prentiss Hobbs, Roy Agee - trombone
David Loucky - bass trombone

References

External links
 

2010 albums
Ben Folds albums
albums arranged by Paul Buckmaster
albums produced by Ben Folds
Nonesuch Records albums